The Sri Lanka national rugby union team, known as the Tuskers, represents Sri Lanka in men's international rugby union. The team has yet to make their debut at the Rugby World Cup. They have the longest tradition of organised club rugby in Asia, dating back to 1879, which was just 8 years after the founding of the world's first rugby union in England. They regularly compete in the Asian Five Nations tournament and are currently in Division I. In the 2010 tournament, they made it to the finals beating Chinese Taipei 37 to 7.

History

Early years
Sri Lanka Rugby has a long history, dating back to the days of British colonialism. The first party to introduce Rugby to Sri Lanka is Kingswood College in Kandy, with the first club, Colombo Football Club, being established on 28 June 1879.

The nation's first "national" match was on 12 September 1907 and involved an All Ceylon team against the professional All Blacks (the New Zealand rugby league team) under rugby union rules on their 1907–1908 New Zealand rugby tour of Australia and Great Britain. The professional All Blacks won the match 33-6. The Ceylon Rugby Football Union was founded 10 August 1908. In 1974 it changed its name to the Sri Lanka Rugby Football Union.

20th century
In 1932 the Ceylon RFU XV won the All India Cup at all India Rugby Football Tournament

Both the 1930 and the 1950 British Lions tour to New Zealand and Australia played unofficial matches in Ceylon on their way home.

Mahesh Rodrigo, better known as an international cricketer, also captained the national team.

World Cup qualifying
1995 World Cup

In 1994, Sri Lanka entered into their first World Cup qualification tournament for a spot at the 1995 Rugby World Cup. They were drawn in Group A with Japan, Taiwan and Malaysia. After only losing by five points to Malaysia, they would concede 92 more points against the other two teams in the group to finish bottom of the group with no points.

1999 World Cup

In 1997, Sri Lanka participated in the opening round of 1999 Rugby World Cup qualifying. After defeating Thailand and Singapore in the opening round, they next took on Chinese Taipei and Malaysia with the winner going through to the third round. After knocking off Malaysia by 22 points in Kuala Lumpur in their opening match, they would be eliminated after losing to Chinese Taipei 31-27 which gave Chinese Taipei the spot into the third round.

New millennium
The furthest they have made was to Round 2 of the Asian qualifying competition for the 2007 Rugby World Cup in France. The Sri Lanka rugby team performed above expectations during the qualifying campaign for the World Cup, and saw their world ranking improve from 68th to 43rd place, and its Asian ranking improve to fifth place.

World Cup qualifying
2003 World Cup

2007 World Cup

2010s
Asian Five Nations and World Cup qualifying;

2008 - 2010

2008 was the first year of Asian Five Nations, which replaced the ARFU Asian Rugby Championship and the ARFU Asian Rugby Series. At the Divisional tournament Sri Lanka finished third, drawing against Singapore and losing to Chinese Taipei. The Chinese team withdrew from the tournament due to lack of visa availability and were relegated to Division Two.

In 2009 Sri Lanka again finished third in the Divisional tournament defeating Thailand (51-17) in the 3rd-place final, remaining in Division One.

Sri Lanka won Division One of the 2010 Divisional tournament beating Singapore (23-16) in the final, thereby winning promotion to the 2011 Asian Five Nations for the first time.

2011 - 2016

Despite a drawn match with United Arab Emirates (13-13), Sri Lanka lost its remaining three matches in the 2011 Asian Five Nations tournament and finished last, resulting in its demotion out of the Asian Five Nations.

In the 2012 Division tournament the team won two matches but were defeated by the Philippines, which meant Sri Lanka missed out on promotion and remained in Division One.

At the 2013 Division tournament held in Colombo, Sri Lanka were successful in winning all three of its matches earning a promotion to the Asian Five Nations.

In 2014 Sri Lanka lost all four of its matches in the Asian Five Nations and were relegated back to Division One.

At the 2015 Division tournament held in the Philippines in May, Sri Lanka beat the Philippines 27-14 to become the champions of the Asian Division 1, resulting in the team qualifying to compete in a challenge match, in June, against the third ranked Asian team and a potential spot in the 2016 Asian Championship. Due to financial reasons, the challenge game was cancelled with South Korea remaining in the tri-nations division and Sri Lanka in the Division 1 competition for 2016.

In 2016 Sri Lanka finished second at the Division tournament held in Kuala Lumpur, Malaysia in May. Sri Lanka defeated both Singapore and the Philippines but lost to hosts Malaysia.

Home grounds
 Colombo Racecourse International Arena (Main Ground)
 CR & FC Grounds – Colombo 7
 CH & FC Grounds – Colombo 7
 Police Grounds – Colombo 5
 Army Grounds – Galle Face
 Nittawela rugby stadium– Kandy
 Air Force Grounds – Ratmalana
 Navy Grounds – Welisara
 Havelock Park– Havelock Town
 Maligawa Grounds - Kurunegala
 Bogambara Stadium - Kandy
 Peoples' Park - Anuradhapura
 Slim Line Grounds — Pannala
 Vincent Dias Stadium - Badulla
 Army Grounds — Anuradhapura

Players

Current squad

Officials

Coaches
 Head Coach:  Matt Lee (2019–Present)

Council Members
 Chairman — Dr. Maiya Gunasekera
 Team Manager - Sanjaya Fernando
 SLRFU President - Asanga Seneviratne
 Vice President - Lasitha Guneratne
 Secretary - Rizly Illyas
 Executive Director - Dilroy Fernando

Former coaches
  George Simpkin (?-?)
  Willie Hetaraka (September 2006-?)
  Tavita Tulagaese (?-)
  Rob Yule (March 2007–August 2008)
  Dawie Snyman (August 2008–April 2010)
  John Carrington (2009)
  Johan Taylor (? -January 2011)
  Ellis Meachen (January 2011–March 2012)
  Ravin Du Plessis (January 2013–?)
  Inthi Marikar (2009 - 2010)
  Leonard de Zilwa (2014-2015)
  Tony Amit (?-?)
  Johan Taylor (2015–2019)
Assistant coaches
  Tavita Tulagaese
  C. P. Abeygunawardene
  Norman Laker (August 2008–April 2010)

Overall Record

Sri Lankan Test record against all nations as of 2013:

Upcoming fixtures

Recent results

Green background indicates a win. Red background indicates a loss. Yellow background indicates a draw.

References

External links
 2007 Rugby Asiad
 Sri Lanka Rugby Football Union official web site
 List and results of all IRB sanctioned international rugby games played by Sri Lanka

 
Asian national rugby union teams